Ellen Schutt is an American politician from southern Wisconsin.  A Republican, she is a member of the Wisconsin State Assembly, representing Wisconsin's 31st Assembly district since January 2023.

Biography
Ellen Schutt grew up in the town of Darien, Wisconsin, and was raised there on her family's farm.  She graduated from Delavan Darien High School and earned her bachelor's degree in political science from the University of Wisconsin–Madison.  While attending the University of Wisconsin, she became active in conservative politics on campus and re-founded the Madison chapter of Young Americans for Freedom, and founded a chapter of the Luce Society—for conservative women.  She interned with Wisconsin state representative Amy Loudenbeck and in the district office of congressman Paul Ryan, handling constituent services and questions.  In her senior year, she received a fellowship with the Clare Booth Luce Center for Conservative Women in Herndon, Virginia.

After earning her bachelor's degree, she was hired as a legislative aide to representative Amy Loudenbeck and worked for her for several years.  She also worked as a research assistant in the office of representative Tony Kurtz.

Political career
In December 2021, Amy Loudenbeck announced that she would run for Secretary of State of Wisconsin, and therefore would not be able to run for another term in the Wisconsin State Assembly.  A few days later, Schutt announced that she would be a candidate for the Republican nomination in Loudenbeck's 31st Assembly district seat.  Ultimately two other candidates entered the Republican primary field, but Schutt prevailed with 42% of the vote.  She went on to defeat the Democratic candidate, Whitewater city councilmember Brienne Brown.

Schutt will assume office in January 2023.

Personal life and family
Ellen Schutt has two brothers and two sisters.  She married Eric Barbour and moved to the village of Clinton, Rock County, Wisconsin.  Barbour is also a legislative staffer and a Republican Party organizer.  He worked for Representative Samantha Kerkman in the Assembly and was campaign manager for state senator Van H. Wanggaard in his 2018 re-election campaign.  He is currently a staffer in the State Senate, and was clerk of the Joint Review Committee on Criminal Penalties during the 2021–2022 session.

Electoral history

Wisconsin Assembly (2022)

| colspan="6" style="text-align:center;background-color: #e9e9e9;"| Republican Primary, August 9, 2022

| colspan="6" style="text-align:center;background-color: #e9e9e9;"| General Election, November 8, 2022

References

External links
 Campaign website
 Personal twitter
 Ellen Schutt at Wisconsin Vote
 

Year of birth unknown
Living people
Republican Party members of the Wisconsin State Assembly
Women state legislators in Wisconsin
People from Darien, Wisconsin
People from Clinton, Rock County, Wisconsin
21st-century American women politicians
Year of birth missing (living people)